Casino is the 1997 follow-up to the album Physical Therapy, and revolves around a casino theme which influences some instrumentation and the name of each track. As the second studio album of Physical Therapy, it features sixteen more minutes of material than its predecessor. It is seemingly, at present, their last foray into commercial music.  In 1998, "Casino" and "A Night at the Palace" were used on The Weather Channel's local forecast segment.

Track listing
"Casino"Terrance Coleman – 4:00
"What the Flush" – 3:55
"A Night at the Palace"Terrance Coleman Mike Fitzgerald Brian White – 4:25
"Painted Skies"Terrance Coleman – 1:02
"Dockside"Terrance Coleman Mike Fitzgerald – 5:25
"All Players Dream"Terrance Coleman Leroi Brashers – 5:48
"Evening Tide" – 6:42
"Double Down"Terrance Coleman Willie Lax – 6:00
"Let it Ride" – 6:10
"Sipping Domm"Terrance Coleman – 6:14
"Lady Luck" – 5:43
"Cordon Blues"Terrance Coleman Mike Fitzgerald – 7:30
"Hit Me" – 3:44
"Hard Count" – 3:13

Specific credits are, all tracks were written by the combined efforts of Terrance Coleman, Michael Fitzgerald, Ben Monroe, and Brian White. Except where noted "Evening Tide" was written by Kent McVey. "Hit Me" was also co-written with Kent McVey.

Audio clip

Personnel

Unlike the previous album Physical Therapy, specific instrumentalist credits are not provided for each track. However, it is unlikely that the band members shifted roles in the few years between albums; these credits from the first album should denote what each band member played.

Terrance Coleman - Bass, Keyboards, Acoustic Guitar
Michael Fitzgerald - Soprano, Alto, and Tenor saxophone, and Keyboards
Ben Monroe - drums and percussion
Brian White - Acoustic Guitar, Electric Guitar, and MIDI Guitars, and Keyboards

In addition, several special guests made contributions to Casino.

Mark Owens - Keyboards (Tracks 1 & 14)
Leroi Brashears - Muted Trumpet & Flugelhorn (Tracks 6, 9, & 10)
Kent KcVey - Keyboards (Tracks 7 & 13)
Kirk Grice - Djembe (Track 6)
Eugene "Spud" Taylor - guitar  parts only (Track 10)
"Skeeta" - All keyboard parts (Tracks 9 & 11)

Production

Producers: Terrance Coleman Brian White, Michael Fitzgerald & Ben Monroe
Co-Producers:  "Christian" (Track (9 & 11) Only
Production Coordination: Mary E. Nelson, esq., Bruce McCaleb, Kristopher Henderson, & Ben Monroe

Production notes

All music was digitally recorded. This album was recorded at The Chapel, St. Louis, Missouri. It was mastered by "Sammy", from Global Sound Mastering. Ben Monroe did primary engineering and mixing. Artwork, special effects, layout and design was done by Pen & Pixel Graphics, Inc. Elcardo's Photography Studio "Hitman the Master" took the pictures of the band members. Back tray card design was done by Grenn Grillo, who previously contributed the 3D art for the first album. The album was released under the Sweatshop Records label; feedback was encouraged to be written to Sweatshop Records, P.O. Box 150299, St. Louis, Missouri 63115.

Back cover writeup

Ahw yes, here we are at the Casino. What The
Flush is that u ask? It's A Night At The Palace
with Painted Skies and all the boats are Dockside.
All Players Dream of that million in cash, as the
Evening Tide rolls in—by my glass. Double Down
u shout, Let It Ride u say, as u sit back Sipping
Domm with your Lady Luck—ok. Cordon Blues is
in the air, so you say Hit Me one more time, before
i make this Hard Count of this cash that's mine.

Physical Therapy "CASINO" Want To Play?

References

1997 albums
Physical Therapy (band) albums